Yuneec International is a Chinese aircraft manufacturer based in Jinxi, Kunshan, a town in Jiangsu owned through an off-shore Cayman Islands holding company, Yuneec Holding Limited. Yuneec was originally a manufacturer of radio-controlled model aircraft and marketed its man-carrying aircraft in the United States through GreenWing International. Yuneec produced the Yuneec International E430, the first electric aircraft designed to be commercially produced, although only prototypes were ever built. In the late 2010s, the company moved to specialize in the development and production of unmanned aerial vehicles (UAVs), for the aerial photography role.

History
Yuneec was originally a manufacturer of radio-controlled model aircraft sold under another brands, primarily Horizon Hobby.

Electric aircraft development
The company built the first successful electric powered paraglider that was manufactured in series production, the EPac. Former company owner Tian Yu then turned his attention to an electric ultralight trike, the Yuneec International ETrike. From there he designed a series of electric motors, the Yuneec Power Drive series, the all-composite E430 and the EViva motorglider. Collaboration with Flightstar Sportplanes of the US brought the Yuneec International e-Spyder design to completion, using an existing airframe with new electric power components.

In July 2010, Yuneec's E430 electric aircraft, won the Lindbergh Electric Airplane Prize at the World Electric Aircraft symposium. Yuneec's e-Spyder was the world's first certified electric aircraft, having received the DULV Type Certification in February 2013.

A pivot to consumer drones (ca. 2014–present)
In 2014 the company became a founding member of Dronecode, a non-profit hosted by the Linux Foundation with the aim of providing Linux kernel-based common free software for drone manufacturers.

In August 2015,  Intel Corporation invested $60 million in Yuneec for a 15% stake. Intel and Yuneec agreed to work together on development of future projects. That same month, Yuneec launched Breeze, a drone capable of capturing UltraHD 4K photos and videos. Yuneec announced a retail partnership with Best Buy covering the Typhoon drone series and the Typhoon Wizard controller.

The Typhoon G featuring its GB203 3-axis gimbal designed for use with the GoPro camera was released in September 2015 to smooth and stabilize aerial footage. In October 2015, Yuneec released the Typhoon Wizard, an ultra-lightweight remote control compatible with the Typhoon drone series designed to be used with one hand. Yuneec partnered with Ocean Alliance, a whale conservation organization, in 2015 to create a safer way of collecting health data from whales. Rather than using biopsy darts, Ocean Alliance began using Yuneec drones outfitted with petri dishes to retrieve samples.

One of Yuneec's drones, the Typhoon Q500+, was seized by the police in June 2016 when its operator was flying it near the White House. The operator crashed a drone on The Ellipse near the White House in October 2015.

Yuneec released the Typhoon H in July 2016. The drone used the Intel RealSense 3D depth camera technology which tracks depth and human motion. The SkyView FPV headset was released in August 2016. The headset connects to a drone's onboard camera allowing the user to control the drone from the first person view.

In late 2016 the company established a new a research and development center, Yuneec Advanced Technology Labs AG, near Zurich, Switzerland to work on computer vision, obstacle avoidance and flight control software development.

At the beginning of 2017 the company introduced the Yuneec H520, a modular hexacopter drone intended for the commercial market, including fire department, police, construction, surveying, inspection and mapping. The H520 can carry various cameras as payloads and can operate in an encrypted mode. A version, the Yuneec 3DR H520-G, was developed in conjunction with drone software company 3D Robotics and intended for the American government and military market.

In May 2017, suppliers reported that the company was arrears, but the company said that it was mainly due to the two sides had different opinions on product delivery quality and payment details. On the other hand, nearly half of Yuneec's suppliers had not been paid for more than a year. Yuneec has not made supplier payments on time since the second quarter of 2017.

In September a 2019 Yuneec announced the Mantis G, a foldable drone with gimballed and stabilized camera. The same month the company and Leica Camera AG announced a strategic partnership and presented the Typhoon H3 drone, which incorporates camera software and hardware co-engineered with Leica.

Aircraft

References

External links

Companies based in Jiangsu
Yuneec aircraft
Unmanned aerial vehicle manufacturers
Aircraft manufacturers of China
Chinese brands